Tim Steward is a musician, singer, and songwriter from Brisbane, Australia. 
Steward was born in the United Kingdom and moved to Townsville, Australia in 1983, and Brisbane in 1989. Steward is most well known for his work in band Screamfeeder which formed in 1991, of which he is the singer, guitarist and principal songwriter.

He is also currently performing in Brisbane band We All Want To, who have released three critically acclaimed albums.

In 2006, Steward released his first solo studio album under Reverberation entitled How Does It End. Other bands/projects he has been involved with include Psycho Skate Smurfs on Smack, Lethal Injections, The Madmen and The Whats. He also played a role in promoting other Brisbane indie artists in the 90s through his record label Stone Groove.

Discography

Tim Steward studio albums
 How Does it End (2006)

Screamfeeder studio albums
 Flour (album) (1992)
 Burn Out Your Name (1993)
 Fill Yourself With Music (1995)
 Kitten Licks (1996)
 Rocks on the Soul (2000)
 Take You Apart (2003)
  Pop Guilt (2017)

Screamfeeder EPs
 Felicitator (1994)
 Closing Alaska (1997)
 Home Age (1999)
 Delusions Of Grandchildren (2005)

Screamfeeder singles
 Fingers and Toes (1993)
 Fill Yourself With Music (1995)
 Who's Counting?/Sweet Little Oranges (1995)
 Dart (1996)
 Static (1996)
 Gravity (1996)
 Triple Hook (1998)
 Hi Cs (1998)
 Above The Dove (2000)
 Stopless (2000)
  Mr Tuba (2001)
 Ice Patrol (2003)
 12345 (2003)
 I Don't Know What To Do Any More (2003)
 Bunny (2004)
 Alone in a Crowd (2015)
 All Over It Again (2016)
 Karen Trust Me (2016)

Compilations 
 Seven Year Glitch (1996) A collection of live recordings, rarities, non-album tracks and pre-Screamfeeder songs.
 Introducing: Screamfeeder (2004) A collection of singles and almost singles.
 Cargo Embargo (B Sides & More) (2011) – digital release only, A collection of all the band's b sides and selected songs which appeared on non-Australian versions of albums.

Live Releases 
 Live at The Zoo, Brisbane, March 2013
 Live at Woodland, December 2011
 Great Northern Hotel, Byron Bay, 13/1/98
 The Corner, Melbourne, 9/1/98
 Tim & Kellie Live in the Library, Singapore
 Tim and Kellie Live at The Zoo, 2001
 Tim Plays Solo 2002

We All Want To studio albums
 We All Want To (2010)
 Come Up Invisible (2012)
 The Haze (2015)

We All Want To EPs
 Back to the Car (2009)
 No Signs (2013)
 Sally Can't See (2013)(US promo EP)

The Whats
 All Mouth No Trousers LP
 A Bit Of Everything with The Whats EP

The Madmen
 Almost Past Caring Single
 Tower Single
 Cool Kinda Kid Single
 Thunder Egg EP''

Awards
 Tim Steward's solo studio album How Does it End was cited as Best Album of 2006 on Fasterlouder.com.au. 
 Tim also won the Skinny's/Rockinghorse Alternative Award and Ellaway's Song of the Year for the song "Not the Same" in the 2007 Q Song Awards. 
 In 2012 Steward was recognised with a star on the Brunswick Street Mall ‘Walk of Fame’ honouring Queensland's finest and most accomplished musicians. 
 The second We All Want To album (Come Up Invisible) was included in the AMP Long List and selected as a finalist for the Q Song Album of the Year in August 2013.
 Tim was awarded the Grant McLennan Fellowship in 2015, traveling to the UK in 2016 to spend a month songwriting. The songs written there appeared on Screamfeeder's Pop Guilt, and will appear on future WE ALL WANT TO releases.

References
Screamfeeder Website
About Tim
About THE WHATS
WE ALL WANT TO Website

Australian male singers
People from Brisbane
Living people
1966 births
Low Transit Industries artists